Chih-Chien Wang (born 1970) is a Taiwanese-born Canadian photographer. Wang was born in Tainan, Taiwan; since 2012, he has lived in Montreal, Quebec.

Collections 
Wang's work is included in the collections of the Montreal Museum of Fine Arts, the Musée national des beaux-arts du Québec, the Montreal Museum of Contemporary Art, the National Gallery of Canada, and the Canada Council Art Bank.

Selected exhibitions 

 As far as we were; as close as I can, Montreal Museum of Fine Arts, Montréal, curated by Diane Charbonneau, 2012
 The Act of Forgetting, Fonderie Darling, Montreal, curated by Caroline Andrieux, 2015
 Under Two Lights, Künstlerhaus Bethanien, Berlin, 2016

References 

1970 births
Living people
Artists from Montreal
Artists from Tainan
Taiwanese emigrants to Canada
21st-century Canadian photographers